Tan Sri Datuk Mazlan bin Ahmad (1941 – 1 April 2018) was a Malaysian civil servant who served as the 4th Mayor of Kuala Lumpur from 1992 to 1995.

Death 
Mazlan died at Hospital Universiti Kebangsaan Malaysia on 1 April 2018 and was buried at Bukit Kiara Muslim Cemetery in Kuala Lumpur.

Honours

Honours of Malaysia 
Malaysia:
 Companion of the Order of the Defender of the Realm (JMN) (1990)
 Commander of the Order of Meritorious Service (PJN) – Datuk (1995)
 Commander of the Order of Loyalty to the Crown of Malaysia (PSM) – Tan Sri (1997)
Perlis:
 Knight Commander of the Order of the Crown of Perlis (DPMP) – Dato' (1995)
Knight Companion of the Order of the Gallant Prince Syed Putra Jamalullail (DSPJ) – Dato' (1997)

References 

1941 births
2018 deaths
People from Perlis
Mayors of Kuala Lumpur
Companions of the Order of the Defender of the Realm
Commanders of the Order of Meritorious Service
Commanders of the Order of Loyalty to the Crown of Malaysia